The Shadow Cabinet of Solomon Islands is the parliamentary Opposition's alternative Cabinet in Solomon Islands. Solomon Islands is a Commonwealth realm with a Westminster system of government; the Shadow Cabinet is modelled on the British institution of the same name.

The Opposition is formally known as "Her Majesty's Official Opposition".

Current Shadow Cabinet
The current Shadow Cabinet was appointed by Opposition Leader Steve Abana on 31 August 2010, following the general election on 4 August, and Abana's unsuccessful attempt to be elected to the premiership. It shadows Prime Minister Danny Philip's coalition Cabinet. Abana's Shadow Cabinet is also a coalition, albeit primarily composed of members of the Democratic Party.

Stanley Sofu, initially appointed Shadow Minister for Infrastructure Development, defected to the government in December 2010.

On 20 January 2011, citing dissatisfaction with the Cabinet being "manipulated by one or two people", Bodo Dettke (Minister for Fisheries), Douglas Ete (Minister for Forestry), Martin Sopage (Minister for Lands and Housing) and Mark Kemakeza (Minister for Mines, Energy and Rural Electrification) all left the government and formally joined Abana's Opposition. It was not immediately made clear what positions they might be given in a Shadow Cabinet reshuffle.

In late March 2011, Abana resigned from the leadership of the Opposition, reportedly under pressure from certain members, and Derek Sikua was elected by Opposition MPs to replace him. A week later, Abana defected to the government, along with four other members of the Opposition (Ricky Houeniopwela, Andrew Hanaria Keniasia, Connelly Sandakabatu and Peter Tom). This split reportedly brought the Opposition numbers down to just six, of which Opposition leader Derek Sikua and his deputy Matthew Wale.

References

Politics of the Solomon Islands
Solomon Islands